The 2001 Campeonato Nacional was Chilean first tier's 70th season which Santiago Wanderers reached its third professional title after 33 years.

Standings

Results

Top goal-scorer
Héctor Tapia (Colo-Colo) 24 goals

Liguilla Pre-Copa Libertadores

Semifinals

Finals 

Cobreloa qualified for the 2001 Copa Libertadores

References

External links
 RSSSF Chile 2001

Primera División de Chile seasons
1
Chile